Then You Can Come Back To Me is a World War I song written and composed by Wolfe Gilbert & Anatol Friedland. The song was first published in 1918 by Gilbert & Friedland, Inc., in New York, NY. The sheet music cover depicts silhouetted soldiers marching with pennants labeled Peace, Victory, and Democracy.

The sheet music can be found at the Pritzker Military Museum & Library.

References 

Bibliography
Parker, Bernard S. World War I Sheet Music Vol 2. Jefferson: McFarland & Company, Inc., 2007. . 

1918 songs
Songs of World War I
Songs written by L. Wolfe Gilbert
Songs written by Anatole Friedland